Lucien Finel (born Lolek Finkelstein; 4 May 1928 – 24 May 2013) was a resistance fighter and French politician. He was a member of the Union for French Democracy and mayor of the 4th arrondissement of Paris from 1997 to 2001.

References 

1928 births
2013 deaths
French politicians
Union for French Democracy politicians
French Resistance members